The swimming competition at the 12th FINA World Aquatics Championships was held in Rod Laver Arena in Melbourne, Australia, from 25 March to 1 April 2007. This portion of the 2007 Worlds featured 40 events (20 for males, 20 for females), all swum in a long course (50 m) pool:
freestyle: 50 m, 100 m, 200 m, 400 m, 800 m and 1500 m;
backstroke: 50 m, 100 m and 200 m;
breaststroke: 50 m, 100 m and 200 m;
butterfly: 50 m, 100 m and 200 m;
individual medley (I.M.): 200 m and 400 m; and
relays: 4x100 m free, 4x200 m free, and 4x100 m medley.

The 2007 World Championships served in qualifying for the Swimming portion at the 2008 Olympics in two ways:

 It was the main relay qualifier, with the top-12 finishers in each relay automatically qualifying for the 16-entry field at the 2008 Olympics (the other 4 teams were filled with the 4 fastest remaining nations).
 Those nations who did not have swimmers who meet the Olympic qualifying times, and wanted a "wildcard" entry into the Olympics, need to have their potential swimmers swim at the 2007 Worlds.

Participating nations
166 nations had 1,142 swimmers entered at the 2007 Worlds:

 Faroe Islands (4)

Event schedule 

Morning/heats sessions began at 10:00 a.m., with the evening sessions (semifinals and finals) beginning at 7:00 p.m. All events were contested in a long-course (50 m) pool. In the 50 m, 100 m, and 200 m events, heats/semifinals/finals were held; with heats in the morning of the first day of the event, semifinals that evening, and finals the next evening. For races 400 m, 800 m, or 1500 m in length, only heats and finals were held. For the 400 m events (both individual and relay), heats and finals were held on the same day. For the individual 800 m and 1500 m free events, heats were held in the morning with finals in the next day's evening session (approximately 36 hours apart). For the 4×200 m freestyle relay, heats and finals were the same day (matching the other 2 relays).

Results
Key
 WR - World Record
 CR - Championship Record

Men's events

Women's events

Medal table

On 11 September 2007, an anti-doping ban was issued to Tunisia's Oussama Mellouli, with a retroactive nullification of his results which included his swims at the 2007 Worlds. Mellouli had finished in the top-3 in 2 events, and consequently, his results nullification adjusted the overall medals standings, particularly effecting Australia, Italy, Poland, Russia and Tunisia (Tunisia was removed all together, as Mellouli was the country's only medal winner).

Records
The following world and championship records were broken during the competition.

World records

Championship records

References 

Melbourne 2007 Swimming results

 
W
2007 World Aquatics Championships
Swimming at the World Aquatics Championships